The Avalon hairstreak (Strymon avalona) is a species of butterfly in the family Lycaenidae.

It is endemic to Santa Catalina Island, off the coast of Southern California in the United States.

References

Avalon
Butterflies of North America
Endemic fauna of California
Fauna of the Channel Islands of California
Fauna of the California chaparral and woodlands
Natural history of Los Angeles County, California
Santa Catalina Island (California)
Taxonomy articles created by Polbot
Butterflies described in 1905